SS Peter Zenger was a Liberty ship built in the United States during World War II. She was named after John Peter Zenger, a printer and journalist in New York City that printed The New York Weekly Journal. He was accused of libel in 1734, by William Cosby, the governor of New York, but the jury acquitted Zenger, who became a symbol for freedom of the press.

Construction
Peter Zenger was laid down on 31 March 1943, under a Maritime Commission (MARCOM) contract, MC hull 1527, by J.A. Jones Construction, Panama City, Florida; she was launched on 4 July 1943.

History
She was allocated to A.H. Bull & Co. Inc., on 31 July 1943. On 11 October 1946, she was laid up in the National Defense Reserve Fleet, in Astoria, Oregon. On 22 July 1954, she was withdrawn from the fleet to be loaded with grain under the "Grain Program 1954", she returned loaded with grain on 4 August 1954. She was withdrawn from the fleet on 20 May 1963, to have the grain unloaded, she returned empty on 25 May 1963. On 19 July 1966, she was sold for $45,355.55 to American Ship Dismantlers, Inc., for scrapping. She was removed from the fleet on 5 August 1966.

See also

Convoy UGS-40

References

Bibliography

 
 
 
 

 

Liberty ships
Ships built in Panama City, Florida
1943 ships
Astoria Reserve Fleet
Astoria Reserve Fleet Grain Program